Garinsky (masculine), Garinskaya (feminine), or Garinskoye (neuter) may refer to:
Garinsky District, a district of Sverdlovsk Oblast, Russia
Garinsky Urban Okrug, the municipal formation which this district is incorporated as
Garinskaya, a rural locality (a village) in Ivanovo Oblast, Russia